Balabanovo is a town in Borovsky District of Kaluga Oblast, Russia, located on the Protva River  northeast of Kaluga, the administrative center of the oblast. Population:

History
It was first mentioned in the early 17th century as a village. It grew due to the construction of the Moscow–Bryansk railway in the early 20th century; Balabanovo railway station was opened in 1899. It was granted town status in 1972.

Administrative and municipal status
Within the framework of administrative divisions, Balabanovo is subordinated to Borovsky District. As a municipal division, the town of Balabanovo is incorporated within Borovsky Municipal District as Balabanovo Urban Settlement.

Transportation
The city has a railway station Balabanovo of the Kiev direction of the Moscow railway. Most trains, including express trains, has stop at the station.

The city has many intercity bus routes to Moscow, Obninsk, Borovsk, Ermolino and other cities. They all start from the main station square.

The town is served by the Yermolino Airport.

References

Notes

Sources

External links
Official website of Balabanovo 
Directory of organizations in Balabanovo 

Cities and towns in Kaluga Oblast
Borovsky Uyezd